The Aycock House (also known as the Aycock-Jamell House) is a historic house located at 410 West Church Street in Morrilton, Arkansas.

Description and history 
Built in 1904 by Elmo Ayock, it is one of the most unusual and elegant houses of the period in the city. It is  stories in height, with a tall hipped-roof pierced by dormers, and a round corner tower with conical roof. A porch wraps around two sides of the house, with round posts and a bracketed cornice. The interior features extremely high quality woodwork, including a staircase constructed from imported English walnut.

The house was listed on the National Register of Historic Places on May 13, 1976.

See also
National Register of Historic Places listings in Conway County, Arkansas

References

Houses on the National Register of Historic Places in Arkansas
Houses completed in 1904
Houses in Conway County, Arkansas
Buildings and structures in Morrilton, Arkansas
Individually listed contributing properties to historic districts on the National Register in Arkansas
National Register of Historic Places in Conway County, Arkansas
1904 establishments in Arkansas